jean-Guy Rakodondravahatra (born 1934 in Tsarahonenana) was a Malagasy clergyman and prelate for the Roman Catholic Diocese of Ihosy. He was appointed bishop in 1972. He died in 1996.

See also
Catholic Church in Madagascar

References 

1934 births
1996 deaths
Malagasy Roman Catholic bishops